Mehmet Akgün (born 6 August 1986) is a Turkish former professional footballer who played as a midfielder.

Career
In the 2005–06 season, Akgün played for Borussia Dortmund II. He was picked several times for the first team squad and played one Bundesliga game.

He was transferred to Kasımpaşa in 2007 and on 20 January 2008 signed a one and a half year contract with Dutch side Willem II. He scored his first goal for Willem II on the opening day of the 2008–09 season against Ajax. On 19 May 2010, he left the Netherlands to sign for the Turkish club Gençlerbirliği S.K.

On 1 June 2012, he signed a two-year contract with Beşiktaş worth €200,000 per annum and €3,000 per game played.

References

External links
 
 

Living people
1986 births
Sportspeople from Bielefeld
German people of Turkish descent
Turkish footballers
German footballers
Footballers from North Rhine-Westphalia
Association football midfielders
Turkey youth international footballers
Bundesliga players
Eredivisie players
Süper Lig players
TFF First League players
Borussia Dortmund players
Borussia Dortmund II players
Kasımpaşa S.K. footballers
Willem II (football club) players
Gençlerbirliği S.K. footballers
Beşiktaş J.K. footballers
Kayseri Erciyesspor footballers
Karşıyaka S.K. footballers
Kastamonuspor footballers
Turkish expatriate footballers
German expatriate footballers
Turkish expatriate sportspeople in the Netherlands
Expatriate footballers in the Netherlands
Turkish expatriate sportspeople in Germany
Expatriate footballers in Turkey